Willy Taofifénua (born 4 February 1963) is a former French rugby player. He played as a flanker for FC Grenoble.

Taofifénua is originally from Wallis and Futuna.

Player
He played for FC Grenoble and his brother Jean-Jacques Taofifénua also played rugby for Grenoble.

A French championship Title private following a refereeing error with Grenoble 1993
Despite overpowering pack called the Mammoths of Grenoble his club tilts on the score of 14–11.
A try of Olivier Brouzet is denied to Grenoble and the decisive try by Gary Whetton was awarded by the referee, Daniel Salles, when in fact the defender Franck Hueber from Grenoble touched down the ball first in his try zone.
This error gave the title to Castres. Salles admitted the error 13 years later.
.
Jacques Fouroux the coach of FC Grenoble in conflict with the Federation and who was already suspicious before the match of the referee cry out conspiracy.

In 1999, Taofifenua was handed a 28-day ban for punching Edinburgh Reivers flanker Graham Doll. In 2006, he became the general manager for the USA Limoges.

Honours
French premiership:
FC Grenoble: 1993 Runners-up

See also
Rugby union in Wallis and Futuna

References

External links
Player Profile

1963 births
Living people
Rugby union players from Wallis and Futuna
French people of Wallis and Futuna descent
Stade Montois players
French rugby union coaches
FC Grenoble players
Rugby union flankers